{{DISPLAYTITLE:Alcohol dehydrogenase (NAD(P)+)}}

In enzymology, an alcohol dehydrogenase [NAD(P)+] is an enzyme that catalyzes the chemical reaction

an alcohol + NAD(P)+  an aldehyde + NAD(P)H + H+

The 3 substrates of this enzyme are alcohol, NAD+, and NADP+, whereas its 4 products are aldehyde, NADH, NADPH, and H+.

This enzyme belongs to the family of oxidoreductases, specifically those acting on the CH-OH group of donor with NAD+ or NADP+ as acceptor. The systematic name of this enzyme class is alcohol:NAD(P)+ oxidoreductase. Other names in common use include retinal reductase, aldehyde reductase (NADPH/NADH), and alcohol dehydrogenase [NAD(P)]. This enzyme participates in glycolysis and gluconeogenesis.

See also
 Alcohol dehydrogenase

References

 

EC 1.1.1
NADPH-dependent enzymes
NADH-dependent enzymes
Enzymes of unknown structure